Dogan may refer to:

 Dogan, English and Irish surname
Dogan, a type of building that occurs frequently in Stephen King's fantasy series The Dark Tower.
 Doğan, Turkish surname and masculine first name
 Doğan News Agency, a Turkish news agency
 Dogan, ethnic slur
 Dogan people, an African tribe living near Timbuktu
 Dogan-e Olya, a village in Iran
 Dogan-e Sofla, a village in Iran
 Dogan (deity), a deity

See also
 Dōgen Zenji (道元禅師), a 13th-century Japanese Buddhist priest